Mitocu Dragomirnei is a commune located in Suceava County, Bukovina, northeastern Romania. It is composed of four villages: namely Dragomirna, Lipoveni (formerly Socolinți), Mitocași, and Mitocu Dragomirnei. The Dragomirna Monastery is situated in this commune.

The commune was inhabited by a sizable community of Bukovina Germans from the late 18th century up until the beginning of World War II. The Roman Catholic church they built still stands to this day.

Administration and local politics

Communal council 

The commune's current local council has the following political composition, according to the results of the 2020 Romanian local elections:

Gallery

References 

Communes in Suceava County
Localities in Southern Bukovina